Ireland competed at the 2020 Winter Youth Olympics in Lausanne, Switzerland from 9 to 22 January 2020.

Alpine skiing

Boys

Girls

See also
Ireland at the 2020 Summer Olympics

References

2020 in Irish sport
Nations at the 2020 Winter Youth Olympics
Ireland at the Youth Olympics